Frank Avray Wilson (3 May 1914 – 1 January 2009) was a British artist, author and vegetarian. He was one of the first British artists to use Tachist or action painting techniques.

Early life
Wilson was born in Vacoas, Mauritius, in 1914, the son of Albert James Wilson, a sugar manufacturer, by his marriage to Anna Avray. He was educated at Brighton College and St John's College, Cambridge, where he took a degree in biology, before studying art in Paris and Norway.

Career
Inspired by both American Abstract Expressionism and French Tachisme, Avray Wilson produced amongst the most dynamic abstracts during the post-war period in Britain. His work ranged from spiky linear compositions, through others more spare and geometric towards a mature style that comprised images both disciplined and energetic. Critic Peter Davies described this contrast as ‘a meaningful, if tense, dichotomy between structure on the one hand and what Avray Wilson termed "Vitalist" or impulsive free form on the other’, whilst Cathy Courtney characterised Avray Wilson’s paintings as ‘articulating something sensed but not fully seen’. Seeking to 'create a synthetic vitality, more living than life, the means of supplying our anti-vital, anti-human society with intense symbols', Avray Wilson's scientific background was of key importance in understanding his approach to painting, which he expounded in several books.

The first London showing of his work was in 1951 at The Redfern Gallery's Summer Exhibition. In 1953, Wilson met Denis Bowen and they formed the New Vision Group then, in 1956, the New Vision Centre Gallery, a showplace for abstract and other modern art near Marble Arch in central London. Avray Wilson had his first solo show at the Obelisk Gallery in 1954, before being included in the British Council's influential La Peinture Anglaise Contemporain, which toured in France and Switzerland. He also took part in the New York Foundation's New Trends in British Painting in Rome in 1957 and was shortlisted for the John Moore's prize exhibition in Liverpool in 1959. He later showed at Leicester Galleries, the Royal Academy of Arts and Austin/Desmond Fine Art amongst others. He was represented for many years by the Redfern Gallery and gained a reputation in Europe, notably in Belgium and in France where he also exhibited. Major retrospectives were held by the Paisnel Gallery in 2011 and by the Whitford Fine Art Gallery in 2016 and 2018.

Avray Wilson’s work is held in the United States by the Carnegie Institute, Pittsburg and Cleveland Museum of Art in Ohio among others. His work can also be found in Australia in the Art Gallery of New South Wales. Public collections in the UK include the Arts Council, the British Museum and galleries in Durham, Leeds, Leicester, Swansea and Wakefield.

Personal life

Avray Wilson married Higford Eckbo, a Norwegian, on 28 April 1936, and they had four children: Wendy-Ann, Raymond, Jason, and Norman. His daughter,  Anglo-Norwegian artist, Wendy-Ann Wilson, went on to marry an American architect, Thomas J. Holzbog, and is the mother of Arabella Holzbog.

Avray was a vegetarian for ethical reasons. He became a vegetarian through influence from his wife. Avray authored two books supportive of vegetarianism for C. W. Daniel Company. He identified as a philosophical vitalist.

Collections
Avray Wilson's work can be found in the following collections:

 British Museum, London
 Victoria and Albert Museum, London
 Fitzwilliam Museum, Cambridge
 National Museum of Wales, Cardiff
 Cheltenham Art Gallery and Museum
 Leeds City Art Gallery
 Manchester City Art Gallery
 Northampton Museum and Art Gallery
 Southampton City Art Gallery
 Glynn Vivian Art Gallery, Swansea
 The Hepworth Wakefield
 The Carnegie Institute, Pittsburgh
 The Getty Research Institute, California
 Cleveland Museum of Art, Ohio
 The Toledo Museum of Art, Ohio
 The National Museum, Gdańsk

Selected exhibitions
 1954: Obelisk Gallery, London
 1955: Frank Avray Wilson: Recent Paintings, AIA Gallery, London
 1956: Galerie Helios Art, Brussels
 1957: British Council touring exhibition
 1957: Metavisual, Tachist, Abstract, The Redfern Gallery, London
 1957: Frank Avray Wilson, Galerie Craven, Paris
 1958: New Trends in British Painting, Rome
 1958: Survey of Contemporary British Painting, Howard Wise Gallery, New York
 1959: John Moores Prize Exhibition, Liverpool
 1959: Six Young Painters, Arts Council touring exhibition
 1960: Art Alive, Northampton Museum and Art Gallery
 1961: Avray Wilson, The Redfern Gallery, London
 1961: Avray Wilson, Galerie Fricker, Paris
 1961: Commonwealth Vision Painters 1961, Commonwealth Institute, London
 1962: Avray Wilson, Galerie im Griechenbeisl, Vienna
 1970: Works from the Personal Collection of Sir Herbert Read, The Morley Gallery, Morley College, London
 1986: Frank Avray Wilson: recent work and some recent paintings, Warwick Arts Trust, London
 1995: Frank Avray Wilson. An Exhibition of Recent Paintings and Work from the 50s to 80s, The Redfern Gallery, London
 2011: Frank Avray Wilson – the Vital Years, Paisnel Gallery, London
 2016: Frank Avray Wilson: British Taschist, Whitford Fine Art Gallery, London

Bibliography

Wilson was the author of the following books:

 Poems of Hope and Despair, 1949, Port Louis, Mauritius
 Food for the Golden Age, 1954, C. W. Daniel Company
 Art into Life: An Interpretation of Contemporary Trends in Painting, 1958, Centaur Press
 Art as Understanding, 1963, Routledge and Kegan Paul
 Human Existence as a Whole, 1963, Routledge and Kegan Paul
 Food Fit for Humans, 1975, C. W. Daniel Company
 Alchemy as a Way of Life, 1976, C. W. Daniel Company
 Nature Regained, 1976, Branden Press
 Crystal and Cosmos, 1977, Coventure Ltd
 Art as Revelation, 1981, Centaur Press, London
 The Way of Creation: Cosmos, Consciousness and the New Sciences, 1985, Coventure
 Seeing is Believing: A Painter's Search for Meaning, 1995, Book Guild

To mark his 1995 exhibition, The Redfern Gallery published Frank Avray Wilson: An Exhibition of Recent Paintings and Work from the 50s to 80s by Cathy Courtney.

References

External links
Frank Avray Wilson's obituary in The Independent

1914 births
2009 deaths
20th-century British painters
Alumni of St John's College, Cambridge
British male painters
British vegetarianism activists
Mauritian non-fiction writers
People educated at Brighton College
Vitalists
20th-century British male artists